Buttress Hill is a flat-topped hill,  high, with steep rock cliffs on the west side, standing  east of the most northern of the Seven Buttresses on Tabarin Peninsula in the northeastern extremity of the Antarctic Peninsula. It is an inferred volcanic vent of the James Ross Island Volcanic Group and was charted in 1946 by the Falkland Islands Dependencies Survey, so named because of its proximity to the Seven Buttresses.

References 

Hills of Trinity Peninsula
Volcanoes of Graham Land